Plugd Records is Cork City, Ireland's last independent record store.

Run by Jim Horgan and Albert Twomey (Co-founder of Out On A Limb Records), Plugd not only sells records and CDs but also acts as an intimate venue and an important hub for Cork's currently thriving alternative music scene.

Originally based on Washington Street, Plugd temporarily sold music from An Realt Dearg (local pub - now called The Gateway) before relocating to the former ESB substation on Caroline Street. Eventually Plugd Records found a new home on the first floor of the Triskel Arts Centre, Tobin Street (Cork) with its sister café, Gulpd, located on the ground floor.

Past gigs
Past instore gigs held in Plugd Records include:

 Sam Amidon
Seamus Fogarty (Fence Records) in February 2013
Richard Dawson
 Bouts
 September Girls

External links
Official website: www.plugdrecords.com

References

Irish record labels